() is a municipality in Trøndelag county, Norway. It is part of the Namdalen region. The administrative centre of the municipality is the village of Medjå (sometimes called Grong also). Other villages in the municipality include Bergsmoen, Formofoss, Gartland, and Harran.

The  municipality is the 96th largest by area out of the 356 municipalities in Norway. Grong is the 263rd most populous municipality in Norway with a population of 2,287.

General information
Grong was established as a municipality on 1 January 1838 (see formannskapsdistrikt law). On 1 January 1901, the northwestern district of Grong (population: 1,046) was separated to form the new municipality of Høylandet. On 1 January 1923, the large municipality of Grong was divided into four smaller municipalities: Grong (population: 1,272) in the southwest, Harran (population: 630) in the centre, Røyrvik (population: 392) in the northeast, and Namsskogan (population: 469) in the northwest.

During the 1960s, there were many municipal mergers across Norway due to the work of the Schei Committee. On 1 January 1964, the neighboring municipalities of Harran (population: 1,085) and Grong (population: 1,962) were merged (back together) to form a new municipality called Grong.

On 1 January 2018, the municipality switched from the old Nord-Trøndelag county to the new Trøndelag county.

Name
The municipality (originally the parish) is named after the old Grong farm since the first Grong Church was built there. The last element is the plural form of the suffix  which is a common suffix for place names in Norway.

Coat of arms
The coat of arms was granted on 6 February 1987. The official blazon is "Argent, three triangles vert in pale". This means the arms have a field (background) that has a tincture of argent which means it is commonly colored white, but if it is made out of metal, then silver is used. The charge is three green triangles lined up vertically. The green triangles symbolize spruce trees which dominate almost 40% of the municipal areas. The number three symbolizes the three main villages in the municipality: Harran, Bergsmoen, and Medjå. The arms were designed by Einar H. Skjervold.

Churches
The Church of Norway has two parishes within the municipality of Grong. It is part of the Namdal prosti (deanery) in the Diocese of Nidaros.

Geography

Grong is located along the river Namsen in the Namdalen valley. Two major tributaries of the Namsen flow through Grong too: the river Sanddøla and the river Neselva. The Bangsjøene lakes lie at the extreme southern border with Snåsa and Overhalla. The Blåfjella–Skjækerfjella National Park covers a small part of the southeastern part of Grong.

Government
All municipalities in Norway, including Grong, are responsible for primary education (through 10th grade), outpatient health services, senior citizen services, unemployment and other social services, zoning, economic development, and municipal roads. The municipality is governed by a municipal council of elected representatives, which in turn elect a mayor.  The municipality falls under the Trøndelag District Court and the Frostating Court of Appeal.

Municipal council
The municipal council of Grong is made up of 17 representatives that are elected to four year terms. The party breakdown of the council is as follows:

Mayor
The mayors of Grong:

1838–1839: Jørgen Darre Strand 	
1840–1843: Søren Rasmussen Eugenius Sørensen 	
1844–1847: Peder Jakobsen Almås 	
1847–1851: Lorents Mediå	
1852–1853: Elias Iversen Urstad 	
1854–1855: Peder Jakobsen Almås 	
1856–1859: Lorents Mediå 	
1860–1863: Knut Flått  	
1864–1867: Lorents Mediå 	
1868–1871: Hans Fredrik Thoresen 
1872–1879: Svend Matthiesen (V)
1880–1883: Knut Flått 
1884–1887: Lorents Mørkved (V)
1888–1891: Hans Seem (V)
1892–1907: Svend Matthiesen (V)
1908–1910: Hans Seem (V)
1911–1919: Ole Mørkved (V)
1920–1928: Oluf Moe (V)
1929–1934: Martin Bjerken (V)
1934–1935: John Solli (Ap)
1936–1937: Ole L. Haugen (Ap)
1938–1945: Anders O. Seem (NS)
1945-1945: Iver Tømmerås (Bp)
1945-1945: Johannes Tømmerås (V)
1946–1947: Ole L. Haugen (Ap)
1948–1951: Ivar Moe (Bp)
1952–1955: Håkon Letvik (Ap)
1956–1959: Torfinn Haugum (Bp)
1960–1971: Håkon Letvik (Ap)
1972–1982: Agnar Gartland (Sp) 
1982–1983: Oluf Moe (H)
1984–1985: Finn Jørgensen (Ap)
1986–1987: Bo Pettersen (V)
1988–1991: Finn Jørgensen (Ap)
1992–1999: Torbjørn Østerås (Sp) 
1999-2003: Helge Formo (Ap)
2003-2011: Erik Seem (Sp) 
2011-2019: Skjalg Åkerøy (Ap)
2019–present:  Borgny Grande (Sp)

Transportation
The European route E6 highway follows the river Namsen across the municipality, as does the Nordland Line. The two main stations on the Nordland Line are Grong Station in Medjå and Harran Station in Harran. The old Namsos Line railway used to run from Grong to Namsos, but that is now closed.

Notable people 
 Bjarne Fiskum (born 1939 in Harran) a Norwegian violinist, conductor and composer
 Maja Dunfjeld (born 1947) a South Sami researcher and duodji craftswoman, lives in Harran
 Ellinor Jåma (born 1979) a Norwegian Sami politician
 Line Viken (born 1981) & Stian Saugestad (born 1992) Norwegian alpine skiers representing the sports club Grong IL

Media gallery

References

External links

Municipal fact sheet from Statistics Norway 

 
Municipalities of Trøndelag
1838 establishments in Norway